Thomas Briels (born 23 August 1987) is a Belgian field hockey player who plays as a forward for Dutch Hoofdklasse club Oranje-Rood. He played a total of 359 times for the Belgium national team from 2006 until 2021.

Club career
Briels started playing at Dragons when he was around five years old. In 2008, he signed a contract with the Dutch club Oranje Zwart in Eindhoven. He left Oranje Zwart in 2015 to return to Dragons. He returned to Eindhoven in 2018, when he signed for Oranje-Rood.

International career
Briels plays for the national team, for whom he had gathered 84 caps by 2009. In 2007 he qualified with Belgium for the 2008 Olympic tournament in Beijing where they would end up ninth. At the 2012 Summer Olympics, he competed for the national team in the men's tournament where they eventually finished fifth. With Belgium he became European vice-champion at the 2013 European Championship on home ground in Boom.

At the 2016 Olympics, he was part of the Belgian team which won the silver medal. He was the captain of the Belgian team that won the 2018 World Cup and the 2019 EuroHockey Championship. On 25 May 2021, he was selected as the captain for the squad for the 2021 EuroHockey Championship. After the European Championship he was named as a reserve for the 2020 Summer Olympics. Despite being named as a reserve he still played in seven of the eight games in the tournament where they won Belgium its first Olympic hockey gold. After the Olympics he announced his retirement from international hockey.

References

External links

1987 births
Living people
People from Wilrijk
Sportspeople from Antwerp
Belgian male field hockey players
Male field hockey forwards
Field hockey players at the 2008 Summer Olympics
Field hockey players at the 2012 Summer Olympics
2014 Men's Hockey World Cup players
Field hockey players at the 2016 Summer Olympics
2018 Men's Hockey World Cup players
Field hockey players at the 2020 Summer Olympics
Olympic field hockey players of Belgium
Olympic silver medalists for Belgium
Olympic medalists in field hockey
Medalists at the 2016 Summer Olympics
KHC Dragons players
Oranje Zwart players
HC Oranje-Rood players
Men's Belgian Hockey League players
Men's Hoofdklasse Hockey players
Olympic gold medalists for Belgium
Medalists at the 2020 Summer Olympics